ESBAŞ station is an İZBAN station in northern Gaziemir, İzmir. The station was opened on 30 August 2010 as one of the five new railway stations added to the line. Passenger traffic greatly increased in 2012, when the Optimum Outlet opened adjacent to ESBAŞ station. It named after Aegean Free Zone's abbreviation in Turkish, ESBAŞ.

Like most İZBAN stations, ESBAŞ consists of two side platforms serving two tracks. The station lobby is located on a bridge over the tracks, consisting of turnstiles, ticket machines and station security. Escalators and elevators are available for both platforms.

Gallery

Nearby Places of Interest

Optimum Shopping Center

Railway stations in İzmir Province
Railway stations opened in 1970
1970 establishments in Turkey
Gaziemir District